The now-called Miss Universe Thailand 2012, formerly titled Miss Thailand Universe up until last year, the 13th Miss Universe Thailand pageant was held at Siam Pavalai Royal Grand Theatre, Siam Paragon in Bangkok, Thailand on June 2, 2012.  The contestants will camp in Phitsanulok. before flying back to Bangkok for the final stage. Chanyasorn Sakornchan, Miss Thailand Universe 2011, will crown her successor at the end of this event.

In the final round, broadcast live on Channel 5. Farida Waller, was crowned Miss Universe Thailand 2012 by Chanyasorn Sakornchan, Miss Thailand Universe 2011.

The winner will be the representative for Miss Thailand at the Miss Universe 2012 pageant in Las Vegas, United States and the 1st Runner-up participate in Miss Earth 2012 in Manila, Philippines.

Results

Placements
Color keys

Special awards

Judges
Preeya Kullavanich
Petcharaporn Watcharapol
Patra Sila-on - President S&P Public Company Limited Thailand.
Apasra Hongsakula - Miss Universe 1965 from Thailand.
Preecha Thaothong
Sudarat Burapachaisri
Takonkiet Viravan 
Wilak Lothong 
Akkaphan Namart - Actor

Delegates

Notes
 #7 Sawitree Sangmuang competed in Miss Thailand 2010, where she won Miss Healthy Slim award.
 #17 Rawatchanan Pattanamoonchai competed in Miss Thailand World 2009, but both did not place.
 #24 Narutchwee Klunpailee competed in Miss Thailand Universe 2010, where she placed at the Top 12.

References

External links
 Miss Universe Thailand official website

2012
2012 beauty pageants
2012 in Bangkok
June 2012 events in Thailand
Beauty pageants in Thailand